Episcada apuleia is a species of butterfly of the family Nymphalidae. It is found in Ecuador, Bolivia and Peru.

The wingspan is 50–60 mm.

Subspecies
Episcada apuleia apuleia (Ecuador)
Episcada apuleia santanella (Haensch, 1903) (Ecuador)
Episcada apuleia cora Haensch, 1909 (Bolivia)

References

Ithomiini
Nymphalidae of South America
Taxa named by William Chapman Hewitson
Butterflies described in 1868